Patent Office fire may refer to:

 1836 U.S. Patent Office fire
 1877 U.S. Patent Office fire